The 2020 season was Perak's 17th consecutive season in Malaysia Super League, the top flight of Malaysian football.

Players

Current squad

Statistics

Appearances and goals

|-
!colspan="14"|Players away from the club on loan:
|-
!colspan="14"|Players who left Perak during the season:
|}

Perak II

Squad statistics

|}

References

Perak F.C.
Perak F.C. seasons
Perak